In enzymology, a manganese peroxidase is an enzyme that catalyzes the chemical reaction

2 Mn(II) + 2 H+ + H2O2  2 Mn(III) + 2 H2O

The 3 substrates of this enzyme are Mn(II), H+, and H2O2, whereas its two products are Mn(III) and H2O.

This enzyme belongs to the family of oxidoreductases, to be specific those acting on a peroxide as acceptor (peroxidases).  The systematic name of this enzyme class is Mn(II):hydrogen-peroxide oxidoreductase. Other names in common use include peroxidase-M2, and Mn-dependent (NADH-oxidizing) peroxidase.  It employs one cofactor, heme.  This enzyme needs Ca2+ for activity.

White rot fungi secrete this enzyme to aid lignin degradation.

Discovery and characterization
Manganese peroxidase (commonly referred to as MnP) was discovered in 1985 simultaneously by the research groups of Michael H. Gold and Ronald Crawford  in the fungus Phanerochaete chrysosporium. The protein was genetically sequenced in P. chrysoporium in 1989. The enzyme is thought to be unique to Basidiomycota as no bacterium, yeast, or mold species has yet been found which naturally produces it.

Reaction mechanism

MnP catalysis occurs in a series of irreversible oxidation-reduction (redox) reactions which follow a ping-pong mechanism with second order kinetics. In the first step of the catalytic cycle, H2O2, or an organic peroxide, enters the active site of MnP. There the oxygen in H2O2 binds to an Fe(III) ion in the heme cofactor to form an iron peroxide complex. Two electrons are transferred from Fe3+ to peroxide, breaking the oxygen-peroxide bond to form H2O and a Fe(IV) oxo-porphyrin radical complex. This oxidized intermediate is known as MnP Compound I. MnP Compound I then binds to a monochelated Mn(II) ion, which donates an electron to quench the radical and form Mn(III) and MnP Compound II, a Fe(IV) oxo-porphyrin complex. MnP Compound II oxidizes another Mn(II) ion to Mn(III) and is reduced by the reaction of two H+ ions and the iron bound oxygen. This reforms the Fe(III) ion in the heme and releases a second water molecule.
There are many deviations from this traditional catalytic cycle. MnP Compound I can be used to oxidize free Mn(II), ferrocyanide, as well as phenolics, and other aromatic compounds.

Chelators
Mn(III) is unstable in aqueous media, therefore MnP releases it as a Mn(III)-carboxylic acid chelate. There are a variety of carboxylic acid chelators including oxalate, malonate, tartrate, and lactate, however oxalate is the most common.  The peroxidase structure favors Mn(III)-chelates over free Mn(III) ions. The Mn(III) chelate interacts with the active site to facilitate product release from the enzyme. The chelator can have an effect on the kinetic rate and even the catalyzed reaction. If the substrate Mn(II) is chelated with lactate, MnP instead catalyzes the evolution of O2. However, this side reaction has little impact on enzymatic activity because it follows slower third order kinetics.

Structural studies

Although MnP, like other lignin peroxidases, is a Class II peroxidase, it has a similar tertiary structure to prokaryotic Class I peroxidases, but contains disulfide bridges like the Class III peroxidases in plants. MnP has a globular structure containing 11-12 α-helices, depending on the species it is produced in. It is stabilized by 10 cystine amino acid residues which form 5 disulfide bridges, one of which is near the C-terminal area. The active site contains a heme cofactor which is bound by two Ca2+ ions, one above and one below the heme. Near the internal heme propionate are three acidic residues which are used to stabilize Mn(II) or Mn(III) when it is bound to the enzyme. The specific residues vary between species, but their number and relative location in the folded protein is conserved. There are a total of 357 amino acid residues in the MnP of P. chrysosoporium, and a similar number in enzymes produced by other basidiomycetes.

Biochemical significance
The major function of the Mn(III) ions produced by MnP is oxidation and degradation of lignin. For this purpose, basidiomycetes secrete MnP, rather than Mn(III), and the enzyme functions outside of the fungal cell. Mn(III) ions from MnP can oxidize the phenolic compounds in lignin directly, but they can also oxidize some organic sulfur compounds and unsaturated fatty acids. This oxidation forms thiyl and peroxyl radicals, which in the presence of O2, can oxidize lignin or react with water to form H2O2. The Mn3+ ion itself can degrade lignin by catalyzing alkyl-aryl cleavages and α-carbon oxidation in phenols.

Regulation
MnP activity is controlled via transcriptional regulation. MnP is up-regulated by increases in extracellular Mn(II) and H2O2 concentrations. It has been found that increased O2 concentration and heat stress also activate MnP.

References

Further reading 

 
 
 

EC 1.11.1
Heme enzymes
Enzymes of known structure